Wendy Mesley (born January 8, 1957) is a Canadian television journalist. She worked for CBC News from 1979 to 2021 in roles including national correspondent and relief. She was the anchor of The National, host of Undercurrents, Disclosure, and Marketplace, and from 2018 to 2020, she hosted the Sunday morning talk show The Weekly with Wendy Mesley.

Broadcast career
Mesley applied to summer jobs with both CBC and CTV in 1979 and received job offers from both, opting to work for CTV in Quebec. By 1981, however, she found herself shifting to CBC.

Mesley hosted CBC Television's consumer investigation series Marketplace and was also a frequent back-up anchor for CBC's flagship evening news program, The National. She co-hosted Test the Nation with Brent Bambury. In 2001 and 2002, she co-hosted the investigative newsmagazine CBC News: Disclosure with Diana Swain, having previously hosted the media and technology series Undercurrents, from 1995 until 2001.

From October 2009, Mesley had a greater presence on CBC's The National and in 2010, she became the program's regular Sunday anchor.

In January 2018, she started hosting a new Sunday morning talk show on politics and media: The Weekly with Wendy Mesley.

On June 9, 2020, Mesley was suspended from The Weekly for saying the word "nigger" in reference to the book White Niggers of America, written by Pierre Vallières, while she was hosting an editorial meeting about race issues. Mesley immediately apologized.

On July 5, 2021, she announced her retirement from CBC. On July 7, 2021, an opinion piece written by Mesley appeared in The Globe and Mail, entitled "I made mistakes. But my departure wasn't the solution to the CBC's problem with racism", which detailed the issues leading up to her retirement. While Mesley did concede to having made a serious error by using the offensive term nigger in editorial meetings on two occasions, once in 2019 and again in 2020, she indicated that her second mistake was in trusting CBC management to manage the story appropriately. She also felt that the punishment administered by management was disproportionate, given that on both occasions, her use of the word was not malicious.

In 2006, she was named by ACTRA as the recipient of its John Drainie Award for lifetime achievement in Canadian broadcasting.

Personal life
Mesley was born in Montreal, Quebec, but her parents' marriage dissolved very soon after her birth, and her mother moved herself and Wendy to Toronto in 1958. Mesley spent her childhood being raised by a single mother as an only child. Her mother, Joan Mesley, was a physiotherapist. Her father, Gordon Mesley, was a radio journalist. Mesley met her father for the first time when she was eighteen.

When she was ten years old, Mesley accompanied her mother to the U.S. consulate to picket in support of Martin Luther King Jr.

On January 6, 1989, Mesley married CBC news anchor Peter Mansbridge, but the marriage ended in 1992. She remarried on April 17, 1998, to marketing executive Liam McQuade and has one daughter with him, Kate Rae McQuade.

In January 2005, Mesley announced that she had found a lump in her left breast and had been diagnosed with breast cancer. After undergoing treatment, including two lumpectomies, chemotherapy, and radiation, Mesley returned to the CBC full-time in March 2006 but was under the care of an oncologist. That same month, her documentary Chasing the Cancer Answer aired.

References

External links

 

1957 births
Living people
Anglophone Quebec people
Canadian television news anchors
Canadian television reporters and correspondents
CBC Television people
Canadian Screen Award winning journalists
Journalists from Montreal
Canadian women television journalists
Toronto Metropolitan University alumni
20th-century Canadian journalists
21st-century Canadian journalists
20th-century Canadian women